Ferdinando d'Adda (27 August 1649 – 27 January 1719) was a Roman Catholic Cardinal, bishop and diplomat. As a member of the family of the counts of Adda, he was a kinsman of Pope Innocent XI, who conferred upon him the titular abbacy of a famous abbey.

Biography
Ferdinando d'Adda was born to an ancient patrician family in Milan. He was educated at Bologna and Pavia. He served as Prefect of the Congregation of Rites. Having performed a purely formal duty in Madrid in 1681, Adda was sent by Innocent XI as Papal Nuncio in London during the reign of James II in November 1685, the Catholic Encyclopedia reports that he was charged with the delicate task of inducing the English King to intercede with Louis XIV (then quite inimical to the Holy See) in favour of the oppressed Protestants of France.

He was made  titular Archbishop of Amasia, and was consecrated in the Royal Chapel of St James's Palace, in a full Roman Catholic ceremony on 1 May 1687 by Dominic Maguire, Archbishop of Armagh, with John Leyburn, Titular Bishop of Adramyttium, and John O'Molony, Bishop of Killaloe, serving as co-consecrators. The King's decision at the ceremony to prostrate himself before d'Adda horrified his Protestant courtiers, who were in no way reassured by his explanation that he was kneeling to d'Adda as Archbishop, not as nuncio. During his residence in England he was often quite critical of the King's policies: he was one of the few Catholic observers who understood that the Trial of the Seven Bishops for seditious libel, (in that they had refused to republish the King's  Declaration of Indulgence) would be a serious political mistake. He remarked "This matter seems very serious, and perhaps the most critical that has yet arisen in this reign. It could yet have more implications than are yet apparent."

D'Adda was made Cardinal Priest of San Clemente by Pope Alexander VIII in 1690. In 1715, d'Adda was made Cardinal Bishop of Albano, and began a thorough restoration of Albano Cathedral, where his memorial records his works.

He died in Rome in 1719 and is buried in the church of San Carlo ai Catinari.

Works

References

Attribution

1649 births
1719 deaths
Clergy from Milan
18th-century Italian cardinals
Cardinal-bishops of Albano
Diplomats of the Holy See
18th-century Italian Roman Catholic bishops
Cardinals created by Pope Alexander VIII
Apostolic Nuncios to Great Britain